KKDA may refer to:

KKDA-FM, a radio station (104.5 FM) licensed to Dallas, Texas, United States
KKDA (AM), a radio station (730 AM) licensed to Grand Prairie, Texas, United States